Riley Park is a stadium in Sumter, South Carolina, located at Church Street & DuBose Street, 29150.  It is primarily used for baseball, has housed Sumter minor league baseball teams and is currently home to the University of South Carolina Sumter Fire Ants and Morris College Hornet baseball teams.

History
Riley Park was the home to various Sumter minor league baseball teams from 1949–1991.  The  Sumter Chicks (1949-1950) of the Tri-State League, Sumter Indians (1970) and Sumter Astros (1971) of the Western Carolinas League and the Sumter Braves (1985-1990) and Sumter Flyers  (1991) of the South Atlantic League all played at Riley Park.

Today, Riley Park is a newly renovated 2,000-seat stadium offering concessions and ample spectator space.  The stadium is used for American Legion Baseball and collegiate baseball. It is home of the American Legion P-15's team. On the collegiate level, it hosts both the University of South Carolina Sumter Fire Ants and Morris College Hornet baseball teams.

References

1934 establishments in South Carolina
Sports venues completed in 1934
Minor league baseball venues
Baseball venues in South Carolina
Sports venues in Sumter County, South Carolina
College baseball venues in the United States